Józef Władysław Walaszczyk (13 November 1919 – 20 June 2022) was a Polish leatherworker and businessman who was declared Righteous Among the Nations in 2002 for sheltering Jews during the Holocaust. He has been described as a "second Schindler" or "Polish Schindler".

Early life 
Walaszczyk was born in Częstochowa into an affluent intelligentsia family. His mother was a feldsher and father a journalist. In 1927, after his father died during a visit to the United States, the family's financial situation worsened. His mother decided to move from Warsaw to Rylsk where their cousin, Ludwik Okęcki, owned an estate and a potato flour factory. Walaszczyk continued his education in Częstochowa, Aleksandrów Kujawski, Łowicz, and Piotrków Trybunalski. Before the outbreak of the war, he had passed the junior high school graduation examination and was studying at the senior high school of commerce in Warsaw. He was living in a studio apartment at 34 Krucza Street. He worked in trade, with enough success to lead a quite affluent lifestyle. At that time he had some Jewish acquaintances. He spent his holidays in Rylsk, where Okęcki was teaching him to run the estate. In 1938, he joined the National Party which he quickly quit because of its antisemitism.

Second World War

Rylsk 
In June 1939, Walaszczyk was taking part in the military preparatory course near Lidzbark Warmiński. After the Germans invaded Poland on 1 September 1939, he was mobilised and sent to Brześć, Eastern Poland. When the Soviet Union attacked Poland on 17 September 1939, Walaszczyk and his cousin, who also was sent there, decided to return to Rylsk instead of going to the Romanian Bridgehead, which was their initial idea. Despite difficulties (Józef was arrested for a couple of days by Germans), they reached Rylsk at the end of September. In December 1939, thanks to his knowledge of German language, Walaszczyk was appointed manager of the factory and as administrator of the whole estate in Rylsk. He was employing around 200 workers including his family, friends, and others in the community (including Jews), providing them with food and accommodation. Most probably in 1941, one of his friends made before 1939, Wengrow, asked him to employ forty Jews from the ghetto in Rawa Mazowiecka. Walaszczyk agreed as he owed him a favour. He got permission from Miller, head of the local Arbeitsamt (labour office), convincing him with a large bribe to get 30 Jews. Walaszczyk needed to bring another installment of the bribe every two weeks. Hired Jews had a good enough situation to take care of themselves, so Walaszczyk did not need to feed them. However, after a dozen months, Miller withdrew his permission. Walaszczyk advised his workers to hide if the Germans appeared. When he was on his way to the Arbeitsamt, German officers appeared at the estate with trucks. A couple of Jews who had not hidden, were arrested and transported to the ghetto in Łódź. The rest hid and survived.

Warsaw 

In 1940 or spring 1941, Walaszczyk fell in love with Irena Front (styling herself Bartczak). She did not tell him she was Jewish until the Gestapo burst into their Warsaw hotel room. Walaszczyk helped Front hide behind a wardrobe and pretended to have stomach problems in the bathroom outside the room. The Germans departed, being assured by the hotel owner that he was a frequent and well known client. Following that incident, Front lived in Walaszczyk's flat on Krucza Street. They arranged a fake wedding so she could be put on the non-Jewish Volksliste. At the end of October 1941, Front was detained with a group of 20 Jewish acquaintances. Walaszczyk, informed about the situation, came to Warsaw. At the police station, where the Home Army had its agent, he was informed that all 21 Jews would be released if he brought the Germans a kilogram of gold (2.2 lb) within 5 hours. The Germans refused to release only Front. Walaszczyk managed to collect and pay the bribe, saving all 21 people. In spite of the assurance from the Germans that Front could safely live at the flat on Krucza Street, he sold the apartment the following day as he felt it not safe anymore and bought another one at 17 Emilii Plater Street. Besides Front, two other Jews lived there – her friend Hanka Staszewska and nanny Helena Torbeczko. Despite his duties in Rylsk, Walaszczyk visited and supported the women. Over a period, Staszewska was meeting with a young man, who turned out to be an agent for the Kriminalpolizei. He did not discover her Jewish identity.

Walaszczyk was also cooperating with the Polish resistance movement (amongst others Stanisław Miedza-Tomaszewski) and helping his Jewish friends living in the Warsaw Ghetto, bringing them food, medicines, and documents. He was frequently bribing a tram driver to slow down a little when passing the ghetto so he could jump off safely. During one of his visits, in 1943, he contracted typhus and spent a couple of weeks recovering at the flat on Emilii Plater St.

After the outbreak of the Warsaw uprising in 1944, Walaszczyk organised for Front, Staszewska, and Torbeczko to get out from the besieged city to the Red Cross camp in Podkowa Leśna and on to Rylsk. Walaszczyk decided to leave Rylsk, to avoid arrest by the Soviets for being a kulak. In January 1945, he and Front returned to Warsaw where they stayed until the end of the war. Their flat at Emilii Plater Street survived the destruction of Warsaw.

Later life 

Just after the war Walaszczyk and Front moved to Kraków, where he set up new businesses, including organising Kraków–Katowice passenger journeys. Though they broke up, they remained in good relations. Due to Walaszczyk's friendship with the French consul, the Security Service pressured him to leave Kraków. Walaszczyk, in cooperation with Okęcki, launched a wool and cotton materials factory. In 1949, the enterprise was nationalised. Later, Walaszczyk and his Jewish colleagues ran a sewing room in Warsaw which was closed under pressure from the tax office. Walaszczyk's factory was closed after two years in 1952. He was also engaged in the cooperative in Grodzisk Mazowiecki, and then in Rembertów. He worked there for some time, being quite successful. In the meantime, he got permission to work as a master of leatherwork which allowed him to open his own workshop on 18 Jana III Sobieskiego Street in Warsaw. He continued to run it until he was very old.

Around 1950 Walaszczyk married Alicja Jastrzębska, who he had met in Kraków. In 1951, she gave birth to their son Ryszard. Following divorce with Jastrzębska, in 1970, Walaszczyk married Barbara with whom he has a son Sławomir.

In 2002, on Front's recommendation, Walaszczyk was honoured by Yad Vashem with the title of Righteous Among the Nations. He was active in the Polish Association of the Righteous Among the Nations, from August 2008 on served as its Vice-President. In 2009, he was amongst the representatives of Polish Righteous during a visit to the United States, which included meeting with President Barack Obama. In the same year, KARTA Center published his memoir Przywracanie pamięci (Restoring Memory). In 2019, his 100th birthday was commemorated by President of Poland Andrzej Duda. Walaszczyk died on 20 June 2022 in Warsaw.

Honours 

 Righteous Among the Nations (2002)
 Commander of the Order of Polonia Restituta (2008)
 Bronze Cross of Merit
 Pro Patria Medal (2017)
 Pro Bono Poloniae Medal (2019)
 Medal of the Centenary of Regained Independence (2019)

References

Sources

External links 

 

1919 births
2022 deaths
20th-century Polish businesspeople
Businesspeople from Warsaw
Catholic Righteous Among the Nations
Commanders of the Order of Polonia Restituta
Leatherworkers
Men centenarians
People from Częstochowa
Polish artisans
Polish centenarians
Polish resistance members of World War II
Polish Righteous Among the Nations
Recipients of the Bronze Cross of Merit (Poland)
Recipients of the Pro Patria Medal
Recipients of the Medal "Pro Bono Poloniae"
Polish military personnel of World War II